Elections to the United States House of Representatives were held in Pennsylvania on October 9, 1810, for the 12th Congress.  The Federalists were in decline in Pennsylvania at this time.  In six of the eleven districts there were no Federalist candidates.

Background
Eighteen Representatives had been elected in 1808, 16 Democratic-Republicans and 2 Federalists.  One Democratic-Republican resigned and was replaced by another Representative from the same party, so that there was still a 16-2 division.  Four of the Democratic-Republicans and two of the Federalists were "quids", a short-lived alliance of moderate Democratic-Republicans and Federalists.  That was the last year in which the quids as a movement existed.

Congressional districts
Pennsylvania was divided into 11 districts, of which four were plural districts with 11 Representatives between them, with the remaining 7 Representatives elected from single-member districts.  The districts were:
The  (3 seats) consisted of Delaware and Philadelphia counties (including the City of Philadelphia)
The  (3 seats) consisted of Bucks, Luzerne, Montgomery, Northampton, Susquehanna, and Wayne Counties
The  (3 seats) consisted of Berks, Chester, and Lancaster Counties
The  (2 seats) consisted of Cumberland, Dauphin, Huntingdon, and Mifflin Counties
The  consisted of Bradford, Centre, Clearfield, Lycoming, McKean, Northumberland, Potter, and Tioga Counties
The  consisted of Adams and York Counties
The  consisted of Bedford and Franklin Counties
The  consisted of Armstrong, Cambria, Indiana, Jefferson, Somerset, and Westmoreland Counties
The  consisted of Fayette and Greene Counties
The  consisted of Washington County
The  consisted of Allegheny, Beaver, Butler, Crawford, Erie, Mercer, Venango, and Warren Counties

Note: Many of these counties covered much larger areas than they do today, having since been divided into smaller counties

Election results
Fifteen incumbents (14 Democratic-Republicans and 1 Federalist) ran for re-election, of whom ten were re-elected. Two seats changed from Federalist to Democratic-Republican control and one seat changed from Democratic-Republican to Federalist control, for a net loss of 1 seat by the Federalists. In the 1st district, there was a split between three "New School" and one "Old School" Democratic-Republicans, which split the Democratic-Republican vote enough to allow one of the three seats in that district to be won by a Federalist.

Post-Election
All 18 Representatives elected in October appeared in Washington at the start of the 12th Congress.  John Smilie (DR) of the  died December 30, 1812. Abner Lacock (DR) of the  resigned February 24, 1813 after being elected to the Senate.  Both had been re-elected to the 13th Congress, and both districts were left vacant for the remainder of the 12th Congress.

References
Electoral data and information on districts are from the Wilkes University Elections Statistics Project

1810
Pennsylvania
United States House of Representatives